Escuela Nacional Preparatoria Plantel 2 "" is a national senior high school of the National Autonomous University of Mexico (UNAM) Escuela Nacional Preparatoria system located in Iztacalco, Mexico City.

References

External links

 Escuela Nacional Preparatoria Plantel 2 "Erasmo Castellanos Quinto"

High schools in Mexico City